Puerto Rico competed at the 1968 Summer Olympics in Mexico City, Mexico. 58 competitors, 54 men and 4 women, took part in 54 events in 10 sports.

Athletics

Men's 100 metres
 Jorge Vizcarondo
 Round 1 — 10.7 s (→ 7th in heat, did not advance)

Men's 800 metres
 Carlos Baez
 Round 1 — 1:52.6 min (→ 8th in heat, did not advance)

Men's 1500 metres
 Willie Rios
 Round 1 — 4:14.4 min (→ 10th in heat, did not advance)

Men's 110 metres hurdles
 Arnaldo Bristol
 Round 1 — 13.9 s (→ 3rd in heat, advanced to semi final)
 Semi final — 14.1 s (→ 8th in heat, did not advance)

Men's 4x100 metres relay
 Round 1 — DNS

Men's triple jump
 Hector Serrate
 Round 1 — 15.09 m (→ did not advance)

Basketball

Men's team competition
Preliminary Round (Group A)
 Puerto Rico – Senegal 69-26
 Puerto Rico – Yugoslavia 72-93
 Puerto Rico – Italy 65-68
 Puerto Rico – Spain 62-86
 Puerto Rico – Philippines 89-65
 Puerto Rico – Panama 80-69
 Puerto Rico – USA 56-61
 → 5th in group, advanced to playoff
9th-12th placement game 
 Puerto Rico – Cuba 71-65
9th-10th placement game 
 Puerto Rico – Bulgaria 67-57
 → 9th place
Team roster

 ( 4.) Bill McCadney
 ( 5.) Joe Hatton
 ( 6.) Adolfo Porrata
 ( 7.) Angel Cancel
 ( 8.) Rubén Adorno
 ( 9.) Alberto Zamot
 (10.) Raymond Dalmau
 (11.) Jaime Frontera
 (12.) Francisco Córdova
 (13.) Teófilo Cruz
 (14.) Tomás Gutiérrez
 (15.) Mariano Ortiz

Boxing

Flyweight (51 kg)
 Heriberto Cintrón
 Round 1 — Lost to Artur Olech of Poland

Bantamweight (54 kg)
 Andrés Torres
 Round 2 — Lost to Giuseppe Mura of Italy

Featherweight (57 kg)
 Reinaldo Mercado
 Round 1 — Lost to Jovan Pajkovic of Yugoslavia

Lightweight (60 kg)
 Eugenio Febus
 Round 1 — Lost to Abdel Sheed of Sudan

Light welterweight (63.5 kg)
 Adalberto Siebens
 Round 1 — Lost to Habib Galhia of Tunisia

Middleweight (75 kg)
 Saulo Hernández
 Round 1 — Lost to Raúl Marrero of Cuba

Light heavyweight (81 kg)
 Jorge Clemente
 Round of 16 — Lost to Stanislaw Dragan of Poland

Cycling

1000 metres time trial
 Edwin Torres — 1:07.65 min (→ 20th place)

Sprint
 Edwin Torres
 Round 1 — 3rd in heat (→ advanced to repechage)
 Repechage — 2nd in heat (→ did not advance)

Individual pursuit
 Edwin Torres
 Heats — failed to depart (→ no ranking)

Diving

Men's 3 metre springboard
 Jerry Anderson (→ 27th place)
 Héctor Bas (→ 28th place)

Men's 10 metre platform
 Jerry Anderson (→ 34th place)
 Héctor Bas (→ 35th place)

Fencing

One fencer represented Puerto Rico in 1968.

Men's foil
 José Miguel Pérez — defeated in first round
 First round — 6th place in group C with 0 wins and 5 losses (→ did not advance)
lost to 
lost to 
lost to 
lost to 
lost to 

Men's épée
 José Miguel Pérez — defeated in first round
 First round — 7th place in group D with 0 wins and 6 losses (→ did not advance)
lost to 
lost to 
lost to 
lost to 
lost to 
lost to

Sailing

Flying Dutchman class
 Juan Torruella, Radamés Torruella (→ 28th place)

Star class
 Gary Hoyt (→ 10th place)

5.5 metre class
 Lee Gentil, (James Fairbank, Hovey Freeman) (→ 14th place)

Shooting

Nine shooters, all male, represented Puerto Rico in 1968.

25 m pistol
 Fernando Miranda — 558 pts (→ 50th place)

50 m pistol
 José González — 511 pts (→ 63rd place)
 Miguel Barasorda — 481 pts (→ 69th place)

50 m rifle, prone
 Ralph Rodríguez — 588 pts (→ 47th place)
 Alberto Santiago — 582 pts (→ 70th place)

Trap
 George Silvernail — 188 pts (→ 31st place)
 Ángel Marchand — 156 pts (→ 53rd place)

Skeet
 Rafael Batista — 187 pts (→ 27th place)
 Alberto Guerrero — 174 pts (→ 45th place)

Swimming

Men's 100 metres freestyle
 Gary Goodner
 Heats — 55.7 s (→ 3rd in heat, advanced to semi final)
 Semi final — 55.8 s (→ 7th in heat, did not advance)
 Michael Goodner
 Heats — 58.2 s (→ 7th in heat, did not advance)
 José Ferriouli
 Heats — 56.1 s (→ 5th in heat, did not advance)

Women's 100 metres freestyle
 Ana Marcial
 Heats — 1:10.1 min (→ 8th in heat, did not advance)
 Lorna Blake
 Heats — 1:13.2 min (→ 8th in heat, did not advance)
 Kristina Moir
 Heats — 1:07.9 min (→ 8th in heat, did not advance)

Men's 200 metres freestyle
 Gary Goodner
 Heats — 2:06.6 min (→ 5th in heat, did not advance)
 Jorge González
 Heats — 2:09.1 min (→ 4th in heat, did not advance)
 José Ferriouli
 Heats — DNS (→ no ranking)

Women's 200 metres freestyle
 Lorna Blake
 Heats — 2:43.8 min (→ 8th in heat, did not advance)
 Kristina Moir
 Heats — 2:23.1 min (→ 5th in heat, did not advance)
 Ana Marcial
 Heats — DNS (→ no ranking)

Men's 400 metres freestyle
 Michael Goodner
 Heats — 5:00.2 min (→ 6th in heat, did not advance)
 Jorge González
 Heats — 4:38.1 min (→ 5th in heat, did not advance)

Women's 400 metres freestyle
 Lorna Blake
 Heats — 5:54.7 min (→ 6th in heat, did not advance)
 Kristina Moir
 Heats — 4:57.7 min (→ 3rd in heat, did not advance)
 Ana Marcial
 Heats — DNS (→ no ranking)

Women's 800 metres freestyle
 Kristina Moir
 Heats — 10:24.5 min (→ 4th in heat, did not advance)
 Lorna Blake
 Heats — DNS (→ no ranking)
 Ana Marcial
 Heats — DNS (→ no ranking)

Men's 1500 metres freestyle
 Jorge González
 Heats — 19:06.0 min (→ 5th in heat, did not advance)

Women's 100 metres breaststroke
 Liana Vicens
 Heats — 1:25.2 min (→ 7th in heat, did not advance)

Women's 200 metres breaststroke
 Liana Vicens
 Heats — 3:16.2 min (→ 7th in heat, did not advance)

Men's 100 metres backstroke
 Gary Goodner
 Heats — 1:06.3 min (→ 6th in heat, did not advance)
 Francisco Ramis
 Heats — 1:07.2 min (→ 6th in heat, did not advance)

Men's 200 metres backstroke
 Francisco Ramis
 Heats — 2:30.4 min (→ 8th in heat, did not advance)

Men's 100 metres butterfly
 José Ferriouli
 Heats — 1:00.6 min (→ 3rd in heat, advanced to semi final)
 Semi final — 1:00.9 min (→ 7th in heat, did not advance)
 Gary Goodner
 Heats — 1:00.3 min (→ 2nd in heat, advanced to semi final)
 Semi final — 1:00.1 min (→ 6th in heat, did not advance)

Women's 100 metres butterfly
 Ana Marcial
 Heats — 1:17.1 min (→ 6th in heat, did not advance)
 Kristina Moir
 Heats — DNS (→ no ranking)

Men's 200 metres butterfly
 José Ferriouli
 Heats — 2:23.4 min (→ 7th in heat, did not advance)

Women's 200 metres butterfly
 Kristina Moir
 Heats — 2:51.1 min (→ 6th in heat, did not advance)
 Ana Marcial
 Heats — DNS (→ no ranking)

Men's 200 metres individual medley
 José Ferriouli
 Heats — DNS (→ no ranking)

Women's 200 metres individual medley
 Liana Vicens
 Heats — 2:57.0 min (→ 6th in heat, did not advance)
 Kristina Moir
 Heats — 2:42.8 min (→ 5th in heat, did not advance)
 Ana Marcial
 Heats — DNS (→ no ranking)

Men's 400 metres individual medley
 Francisco Ramis
 Heats — 5:30.9 min (→ 7th in heat, did not advance)

Women's 400 metres individual medley
 Kristina Moir
 Heats — DNS (→ no ranking)

Men's 4x100 metres freestyle relay
 Jorge González, Michael Goodner, Gary Goodner, José Ferriouli
 Heats — 3:47.0 min (→ 7th in heat, did not advance)

Men's 4x200 metres freestyle relay
 José Ferriouli, Gary Goodner, Michael Goodner, Jorge González
 Heats — 8:40.2 min (→ 6th in heat, did not advance)

Men's 4x100 metres medley relay
 Francisco Ramis, Gary Goodner, José Ferriouli, Jorge González
 Heats — 4:27.6 min (→ 7th in heat, did not advance)

Women's 4x100 metres medley relay
 Ana Marcial, Kristina Moir, Liana Vicens, Lorna Blake
 Heats — 5:18.2 min (→ 7th in heat, did not advance)

Tennis

Men's singles
 Antonio Ortíz
 Round 1 — Lost to Miguel Olvera of Ecuador
 Alberto Carrero
 Round 1 — Lost to Pierre Darmon of France
 Stanley Pasarell
 Round 1 — Lost to Rafael Osuna of Mexico

Men's doubles
 Stanley Pasarell, Alberto Carrero
 Round 1 — Beat Humberto Camarotti and Juan Brito of Cuba
 Quarter-final — Lost to Joaquín Loyo and Pierre Darmon of Mexico and France

Weightlifting

Featherweight
 Enrique Hernández
 Press — 115.0 kg
 Snatch — 100.0 kg
 Jerk — 130.0 kg
 Total — 345.0 kg (→ 13th place)
 Pedro Serrano
 Press — 97.5 kg
 Snatch — 97.5 kg
 Jerk — 127.5 kg
 Total — 322.5 kg (→ 17th place)

Bantamweight
 Fernando Báez
 Press — 120.0 kg
 Snatch — 92.5 kg
 Jerk — 132.5 kg
 Total — 345.0 kg (→ 6th place)

Light heavyweight
 Angel Pagán
 Press — 145.0 kg
 Snatch — 130.0 kg
 Jerk — 160.0 kg
 Total — 435.0 kg (→ 9th place)
 José Figueroa
 Press — 137.5 kg
 Snatch — 120.0 kg
 Jerk — 152.5 kg
 Total — 410.0 kg (→ 20th place)

Middle heavyweight
 Fernando Torres
 Press — 135.0 kg
 Snatch — 115.0 kg
 Jerk — 155.0 kg
 Total — 405.0 kg (→ 22nd place)

References

External links
Official Olympic Reports
Part Three: Results

Nations at the 1968 Summer Olympics
1968
1968 in Puerto Rican sports